The Westies was the name given by the Irish media to a criminal gang based in Blanchardstown, west Dublin, Ireland.

They controlled the heroin trade in west Dublin in the late 90s and early 2000s and were known for their extreme violence against drug addicts and rival drug dealers. The gang, who were also involved in armed robberies and extortion, imploded after the murders of all of its leaders.

Bernard 'Verb' Sugg (23) was shot dead by two masked men in a pub in Blanchardstown in August 2003. Shane Coates (31) and Stephen Sugg (27) went missing in Spain in 2004. Their bodies were found buried under concrete in a warehouse near Alicante in July 2006. Both had been shot in the head. Spanish police suspect they were killed after crossing another group of Irish gangsters based in Spain. Coates had fled to Spain after being injured in a shoot-out with Gardaí in Cavan in 2003. In April 2005, Andrew Glennon (30) was shot dead after being ambushed by at least four gunmen near his home in Clonee. His brother Mark (32) was shot dead outside his home in Blanchardstown by a lone gunman five months later.

References

Further reading
Williams, Paul. "Crime Lords". Merlin Publishing, 2004. 

1990s establishments in Ireland
Organised crime groups in Ireland